Cristy McKinney (born July 13, 1957) is a women's basketball head coach. She was the head coach at Clemson University from 2005–06 to 2009–10 seasons, with an overall record of 58–93 in five years of coaching. On March 11, 2010, McKinney resigned from head coaching at Clemson. She also served as the head coach for 12 years at Rice University. She posted a 216–139 record at Rice, and is the school's winningest coach. In her final season at Rice, they won the WAC championship, and completed a 24–9 season. Rice made only its second ever NCAA tournament appearance, and she was named WAC coach of the year that year.

In 2001, Rice posted a win over sixth ranked Louisiana Tech, which remains the highest ranked opponent Rice has ever beaten. In 1999, Rice made it to the second round of the NCAA tournament after upsetting 4th seeded UCSB in the first round. As Cristy Earnhardt, she played college basketball at NC State for the legendary coach Kay Yow.

References

External links
https://web.archive.org/web/20080518010023/http://clemsontigers.cstv.com/sports/w-baskbl/mtt/mckinney_cristy00.html

1957 births
American women's basketball coaches
Clemson Tigers women's basketball coaches
NC State Wolfpack women's basketball players
Rice Owls women's basketball coaches
Living people